Edward C. (Bus) Wilbert, Jr. (September 2, 1915 – August 11, 1946) was an American racecar driver.  He was born in Brooklyn, New York and was killed at the age of 31 on August 11, 1946 while in the middle of a race in Indiana.

Career 
He was a racecar driver of both big cars and midgets. His first dirt track racing competition was in 1941, while previous to that he raced midget auto races. In 1941 he joined the U.S. Navy as a test pilot and flight instructor. He was a Lieutenant and a combat pilot. He was a leading driver in the Consolidated Midget Racing Association and he won three AAA Championship races. He was part of the 1946 AAA Championship Car season.

Death 
On August 11, 1946 his car skidded on the shoulder of a turn at Funk's Speedway (later to be called Winchester Speedway) in Winchester, New York. the car struck that of Eddie Zalecki, who lived.
He was married and had a daughter.

References 

1915 births
AAA Championship Car drivers
1946 deaths
Racing drivers from New York City
Racing drivers who died while racing